Luc Eymael (born 20 September 1959) is a Belgian football manager and former player,and married to Patricia Abbruzzese.

Playing career
Luc began his professional footballing career in 1975 with the Fléron-based Royal Star Fléron Football Club, with whom he participated in the Belgian Fourth Division and later helped in promotion to the Belgian Third Division. In 1981, he moved to Ferrières where he signed a one-year contract with Belgian Third Division club, Royale Union Sportive Ferrières.

He first moved out of Belgium in 1983 to Netherlands where he signed a two-year contract with Heerlen-based, Eerste Divisie club, Sporting Heerlen.

In 1985, he moved back to Belgium to Vaux-sous-Chèvremont where he signed a long-term contract with, along with Belgian Fifth Division club, Racing Club Vaux. In a five-year spell with the club, he helped them in promotion to the Belgian Fourth Division.

In 1990, he signed a two-year contract with Huy-based Belgian Third Division club, Royal Football Club Huy.

In 1992, he moved to Virton where he signed a long-term contract with Belgian Fourth Division club, R.E. Virton. He first helped his team in promotion to the Belgian Third Division and later in promotion to the Belgian Second Division.

He then moved to Hasselt where in 1995, he signed a one-year contract with Belgian Second Division club, K.S.C. Hasselt.

Later, in 1996, he signed a one-year contract with Union Royale Namur Fosses-La-Ville and helped the club win the 1996–97 Belgian Third Division, earning a promotion to the Belgian Second Division.

In 1998, he moved to Athus where he signed a one-year contract with Belgian Fourth Division club, Royal Sporting Club Athusien. Finally, he ended his career as a footballer in the year 2000, playing for a season with another Belgian Fourth Division club, Royal Football Club Aubel.

He has also participated in various international tournaments with the Belgium U-14 side, the Belgium national under-16 football team and the Belgium national Military football team.

After a 9-month break, Luc Eymael is back, and it is with the Libyan club, ittihad misrata premier league, that he signs a new contract on August 23, 2022, for a new challenge whose objective is to participate in the final round of this season to qualify for an African Cup.

Managerial career
Luc holds the UEFA Pro Licence, the highest football coaching qualification. He received the UEFA Pro Licence in 2007 and the UEFA A License on 10 September 2002, from the Royal Belgian Football Association. He is also a graduate from the Federal School of football coaching of Union Royale Belge Des Sociétés de Football Association (URBSFA). He also holds the CAF A License which he received from the Tunisian Football Federation on 5 February 2015.

He has worked with many of Belgium's current and former footballing stars including Eden Hazard, Axel Witsel, Logan Bailly, Guillaume Gillet, Christian Benteke and François Sterchele.

Belgium
He began his managerial career in 1999 with Lierneux-based Belgian Fifth Division club, RUS Sartoise. In 2003, he was appointed as the head coach of another Belgian Fifth Division club, Weywertz-based, FC Weywertz. In 2004, he moved to Arlon where he signed a three-year contract with Football Club Jeunesse Lorraine Arlonaise with whom he participated in the Belgian Fourth Division and later helped them get promoted to the Belgian Third Division. Later, in 2007, he moved to Spy where he was appointed as the head coach of Belgian Fourth Division club, RFC Spy on a two-year contract. In 2009, he moved to Hamoir where he worked as the head coach of Belgian Third Division club, Royal Racing Club Hamoir and thus ending his eleven-year long-spell in Belgium as a football manager.

AS Vita
Eymael first moved out of Belgium as a football manager in 2010 to the Democratic Republic of the Congo, where on 26 August 2010 he was appointed as the head coach of the Linafoot club AS Vita. In his very first season as the head coach of the Kinshasa-based club, he helped them win the 2010 Linafoot. The team finished at the top just above their archrivals, TP Mazembe. Eymael also helped his club win the 2011 Super Coupe du Congo. The Congolese club also reached the Second Round of the 2011 CAF Champions League under his leadership. He maintained an unbeaten 23-games record with the Kinshasa-based club and later resigned from his position by April 2011.

Missile
In May 2011, he moved to Gabon where on 1 July 2011 he was appointed as the head coach of Gabon Championnat National D1 club, Missile. He helped the Libreville-based club win the 2010–11 Gabon Championnat National D1, which was the first national title won in the history of the club, thus helping them qualify for the 2012 CAF Champions League. He also helped the club reach the First Round of the Round of 16 of the 2011 CAF Confederation Cup where they narrowly lost 0–3 on penalties to Algeria's JS Kabylie after the tie had ended 3–3 on aggregate. In the 2011–12 Gabon Championnat National D1, he helped his team secure the fourth position, thus ending his one-year spell with the Gabonese club. He also helped a number of players from his squad earn caps for the Gabon national football team, one of whom later signed a two-year contract with Russian Football Premier League club, FC Rostov.

MC Oran
In June 2012, he moved to Algeria where he was appointed as the head coach of Algerian Ligue Professionnelle 1 club, MC Oran on a one-year-term contract. Later, in September 2012, due to some financial delays he decided to part ways with the Oran-based club.

A.F.C. Leopards
In April 2013, he moved to Kenya where he signed a short-term contract with Kenyan Premier League club, A.F.C. Leopards. He took charge of the club in April 2013 when the club was struggling at the bottom of the table to avoid relegation to the Kenyan National Super League. By August 2014, he had helped the Nairobi-based club secure the second position in the 2013 Kenyan Premier League, thus helping them qualify for the 2014 CAF Confederation Cup. He also helped them win the 2013 FKF President's Cup.

Rayon Sports
In September 2013, South African club, Orlando Pirates reached an agreement with Eymael, but later the deal failed to materialize. 
In January 2014, he moved to Rwanda where he was appointed as the head coach of Rwanda National Football League club, Rayon Sports F.C. During his short time with the club, the team participated in the 2014 CAF Champions League where they lost on away goals rule to the Republic of the Congo's AC Léopards. He was praised for his impressive work in Rwanda as he helped his side secure 34 points out of 39 in the second leg of the 2013–14 Rwanda National Football League. He resigned as the club's head coach on 30 June 2014, having helped the team secure the second position in the 2013–14 Rwanda National Football League.

JS Kairouan
In July 2014, Eymael moved to Tunisia where he was appointed as the head coach of Tunisian Ligue Professionnelle 1 club, JS Kairouan. He helped the club secure the eighth position in the 2013–14 Tunisian Ligue Professionnelle 1, which was the club's best ever performance in the top division of the Tunisia Football Federation in the past ten years.

Al-Nasr
In November he became the manager of the Oman football club Al-Nasr SC.

Al-Merrikh
On 21 December 2015, he moved to Sudan where, on 23 December 2015, he signed a one-year contract with Al-Merrikh SC. He began his 2016 Sudan Premier League campaign on 27 January 2016 with a 2–0 win over Merrikh Kosti at the Al-Merrikh Stadium. He helped the Sudanese side qualify for the second round of the 2016 CAF Champions League, where they narrowly lost on aggregate to Algerian side, ES Sétif. His side was narrowly eliminated on a 2-1 aggregate in the playoff round of the 2016 CAF Confederation Cup by Moroccan side, Kawkab Marrakech. In all the competitions played by the Sudanese club under Eymael, they managed to win 17 games and played out 3 draws in a total of 22 ties.

Polokwane City
Eymael spent eight months working at Polokwane City. He found the team struggling and ending every year at the bottom half of the league rankings (precisely between position 16 and 14) fighting relegation battles. Eymael joined the club at the start of the 2016–2017 season and helped them end the first half of the campaign in fifth position in the league. This was the first time the club has reached such a high position, which made them title hopefuls. He then resigned amidst rumours he was going to join Bloemfontein Celtic.

Free State Stars
On 24 August 2017, Eymael joined South African Premier Soccer League club Free State Stars, taking over from Sammy Troughton. In 2018, Eymael guided them to their first cup final in 24 years after they beat Kaizer Chiefs 2–0 in the Nedbank Cup semifinal on 21 April 2018. He then took them to their first title, winning the final 1–0 against Maritzburg United.
On 12 November 2018, Eymael resigned from his position as the manager of Free State Stars following a second straight loss in the league with a 1–0 defeat at home against SuperSport United F.C.

Tala el Geish
On 22 November, Eymael signed a new contract in the Egyptian Premier League with Tala'ea El Gaish. On 1 June he finished his contract with Tala El Geish, finishing the season with the club in rank eight, the best position the club had achieved in the past seven years. He managed 20 games, winning eight, finishing six in a draw, and losing six.

Black Leopards

On 1 October 2019, Eymael signed with the Black Leopards in the Premier Soccer League in South Africa. Eymael resigned from his position with the Black Leopards of South Africa, citing personal reasons, after having helped bring them to the top eight.

He took the team at position number 6 in January and succeeded to finish the season on 26 July 2020 at position number 2 and qualified Yanga for the champions league. He was then relieved from his duties after he racially insulted fans in an explosive interview calling them "monkeys" and "dogs".

He managed the Tanzanian Premier League club Young Africans S.C. until July 2020. In July 2021 he was appointed as new manager of Stade Tunisien, but was sacked two months later after the arrival of a new club president.

Stade Tunisien 
Luc Eymael signed a contract in Tunisia on July 1, 2021, but for important family and private reasons, he had to leave the club on September 20, 2021 by mutual agreement.

Ittihad Misutrata 
On 23 August 2022, Eymael signed in the Libyan first division at Ittihad Misrata. The goal is to try to make the final round (play off) of this new season to try to qualify for participation in Africa.

Honors
AS Vita
 Linafoot: 2010
 Super Coupe du Congo: 2011

Missile
 Gabon Championnat National D1: 2010–11

A.F.C. Leopards
 Kenyan Premier League runners-up: 2013
 FKF President's Cup: 2013

Rayon Sports
 Rwanda National Football League runners-up: 2013–14

Free State Stars
 Nedbank Cup: 2018

References

External links

Luc Eymael – EUROSPORT
Luc Eymael – SOCCER PUNTER
Luc Eymael – YouTube
Luc Eymael – YouTube
Luc Eymael – YouTube
Luc Eymael – YouTube
Luc Eymael (Interview) – LaMeuse.be

1959 births
Living people
People from Tongeren
Belgian footballers
Association football goalkeepers
R.E. Virton players
Union Royale Namur Fosses-La-Ville players
Belgian football managers
JS Kairouan managers
Al-Nasr S.C.S.C. managers
Polokwane City F.C. managers
Free State Stars F.C. managers
Expatriate football managers in the Democratic Republic of the Congo
Expatriate football managers in Gabon
Belgian expatriate sportspeople in Gabon
Expatriate football managers in Algeria
Belgian expatriate sportspeople in Algeria
Expatriate football managers in Kenya
Belgian expatriate sportspeople in Kenya
Expatriate football managers in Rwanda
Belgian expatriate sportspeople in Rwanda
Expatriate football managers in Tunisia
Belgian expatriate sportspeople in Tunisia
Expatriate football managers in Oman
Belgian expatriate sportspeople in Oman
Expatriate soccer managers in South Africa
Belgian expatriate sportspeople in South Africa
Expatriate football managers in Egypt
Belgian expatriate sportspeople in Egypt
MC Oran managers
A.F.C. Leopards managers
Tala'ea El Gaish SC managers
AS Vita Club managers
Linafoot managers
Black Leopards F.C. managers
Young Africans S.C. managers
Stade Tunisien managers
Footballers from Limburg (Belgium)